Pelzneria is a genus of mites in the family Acaridae. Species of Pelzneria are most often associated with small vertebrate carrion, and most species are phoretic on silphid beetles of the genus Nicrophorus.

Species
 Pelzneria afluctuosa Mahunka, 1978
 Pelzneria crenulatus (Oudemans, 1909)
 Pelzneria meyerae Mahunka, 1979

References

Acaridae